The Tamil Nadu State Film Award for Best Editor is given by the state government as part of its annual Tamil Nadu State Film Awards for Tamil  (Kollywood) films.

The list

References

General

Specific

Actor
Film editing awards